The grey wrasse (Symphodus cinereus) is a species of wrasse native to the eastern Atlantic Ocean and along the coasts of the Mediterranean Sea to the Black Sea. It can reach  in total length, though most do not exceed . It is important to local peoples as a food fish and is popular as a game fish. It can also be found in the aquarium trade.

References

External links
 

grey wrasse
Fauna of Spain
Marine fish of Europe
Fish of the Black Sea
grey wrasse